"Fiend" is a song by Coal Chamber, from their third album, Dark Days. It is one of the band's most well known songs and is thought to be about how the band and the nu metal genre were getting heavily criticized at the time.

Track listing
 "Fiend" – 3:01

Music video
Dez Fafara and Meegs Rascón drive to a suburban house, where two children are playing outside, their mother, horrified, runs out and ushers them back inside, Fafara and Rascón then walk to the house's garage where Mike Cox and Rayna Foss are waiting, then they perform the song while an increasing crowd of teenagers listens outside.

References 

2002 singles
Coal Chamber songs
2002 songs
Roadrunner Records singles